Bomaka is a locality in Buea, Cameroon. The area has experiences violence between anglophone and francophone members of the community.

References

Buea